Macromphalina worsfoldi is a species of very small sea snail, a marine gastropod mollusk in the family Vanikoridae.

Description and Distribution
The Macromphalina worsfoldi shell size is at most 1.7 mm wide.
It is found in the Bahamas.

References

Vanikoridae
Gastropods described in 1998